Fernanda Kuhnen Hermenegildo (born 13 October 1988) is a former professional Brazilian tennis player and member of the Brazil Fed Cup team.

On August 30, 2010, she reached her highest singles ranking by the WTA of 370 whilst her best doubles ranking was 251 on August 22, 2011.

ITF Circuit finals

Singles: 6 (3–3)

Doubles: 24 (8–16)

References

External links
 
 
 

1988 births
Living people
Brazilian female tennis players
20th-century Brazilian women
21st-century Brazilian women